"Superstar" is a 1969 song written by Bonnie Bramlett and Leon Russell with a songwriting credit also given to Delaney Bramlett that has been a hit for many artists in different genres and interpretations in the years since; the best-known versions are by the Carpenters in 1971, and by Luther Vandross in 1983.

Original Delaney and Bonnie version
Rita Coolidge came up with this song idea based on observing female groupies' relationships with rock stars of the late 1960s.

In its first recorded incarnation, the song was called "Groupie (Superstar)", and was recorded and released as a B-side to the Delaney & Bonnie single "Comin' Home" in December 1969. Released by Atco Records in the United States and Atlantic Records in the rest of the world, the full credit on the single was to Delaney & Bonnie and Friends featuring Eric Clapton.

"Comin' Home" reached number 84 on the US pop singles chart, although it achieved a peak of sixteen on the UK Singles Chart.

The original version finally surfaced on an album in 1972 when D&B Together was released, shortly before their marriage and collaboration ended. This version was also included as a bonus track on a 2006 reissue of the 1970 album Eric Clapton.

Bonnie Bramlett later rerecorded the song on her 2002 solo album I'm Still the Same. Now using just the "Superstar" title, she rendered it this time as a very slow, piano-based torch song.

Personnel
(Taken from the liner notes of the 2006 Deluxe Edition of the Eric Clapton album):

 Delaney Bramlett - rhythm guitar & vocals
 Bonnie Bramlett - vocals
 Eric Clapton - lead guitar
 Dave Mason - guitar
 Bobby Whitlock - organ
 Carl Radle - bass
 Jim Gordon - drums
 Jim Price - trumpet
 Bobby Keys - tenor sax
 Tex Johnson - percussion
 Rita Coolidge - vocals

Produced by Delaney Bramlett, recorded at A&M Studios, Los Angeles, September 27October 10, 1969.

Carpenters version

"Superstar" became most popular after its treatment by the Carpenters. Richard Carpenter became aware of the song after watching Bette Midler sing the song on the February 15, 1971 edition of The Tonight Show with Johnny Carson.

Produced by Richard Carpenter with Jack Daugherty, it was recorded with members of the Wrecking Crew, a famed collection of Los Angeles-area session musicians. As the song's original subject matter was more risqué than what was typical for the Carpenters, Richard changed a lyric in the second verse from "And I can hardly wait/To sleep with you again" to the less suggestive "And I can hardly wait/To be with you again." The track was finished in one take.

Karen Carpenter's vocal was praised for its intensity and emotional nature. David Hepworth commented: "Even with only half her mind on the job, she delivered a perfect performance. The guide vocal never needed to be replaced."

The duo's rendition was included on the May 1971 album Carpenters, and then released as a single in August 1971, rising to number 2 on the Billboard Hot 100 pop singles chart (held out of the top spot by Rod Stewart's "Maggie May"), and spending two weeks at number one on the Easy Listening chart that autumn,  earning gold record status. It reached number 18 on the UK pop singles chart and charted in Australia and New Zealand as well.

Richard was nominated for a Grammy Award for Best Arrangement Accompanying Vocalist for the song. "Superstar" would go on to appear on two mid-1970s Carpenters live albums as well as on many compilation albums, including the 2004 SACD compilation The Singles: 1969–1981 (not to be confused with the regular CD, The Singles: 1969–1981) as a remix of the original 1973 mix on the similarly titled compilation The Singles: 1969–1973.

Personnel
Karen Carpenterlead & backing vocals
Richard Carpenterbacking vocals, piano, Wurlitzer electric piano, Fender Rhodes electric piano, orchestration
Joe Osbornbass guitar
Hal Blainedrums
Earle Dumleroboe

Chart performance

Weekly charts

Year-end charts

Luther Vandross version

In the early 1980s, American R&B/soul singer-songwriter Luther Vandross had "Superstar" in his stage act, sometimes in a rendition that stretched to 12 minutes, with vocal interpolations and an interpretive dancer.

Vandross then recorded "Superstar" in 1983 in a slower, more soulful fashion, as part of a medley with Stevie Wonder's "Until You Come Back to Me (That's What I'm Gonna Do)" on his album Busy Body. Released as a single the following year, it became an R&B hit, reaching number 5 on the Billboard Top R&B Singles chart. It did not have much pop crossover effect, however, only reaching number 87 on the Billboard Hot 100.

Charts

Ruben Studdard version

Second-season American Idol contestant Ruben Studdard found his melismatic, R&B groove early in the Final 12 rounds when he performed a Vandross-influenced "Superstar". It got rave reviews from the judges and established Studdard as one of the early leaders in the competition, a position he held through his narrow May 2003 win over second-place finisher Clay Aiken.

By now his signature song, Studdard recorded "Superstar" as the B-side of his June 2003 first single and number two hit, "Flying Without Wings". Studdard earned a 2004 Grammy Award nomination for Best Male R&B Vocal Performance for "Superstar", but he lost to his own idol, Vandross, who won for "Dance with My Father". Studdard's treatment was also included on his December 2003 debut album, Soulful.

Other notable versions
In August 1970, the live album Mad Dogs and Englishmen by Joe Cocker was released, using performances of the song, recorded in March and June of that year. Sung by Rita Coolidge, the Mad Dogs album became a hit, reaching number 2 on the Billboard pop albums chart and number 23 on the Billboard Black Albums chart.
In October 1970, Cher recorded the song, produced by Stan Vincent. The following month, Atlantic issued a one-sided white label DJ single to radios. Despite favorable reviews from Variety (magazine) and Billboard, the song vanished without a trace.
 Bette Midler, whose TV performance of "Superstar" first brought the song to Richard Carpenter's attention, included a version of it on her 1972 debut album The Divine Miss M.
 The band Sonic Youth, which had always found inspiration from the Carpenters, recorded a version of the selection for the 1994 tribute album If I Were a Carpenter. It reached No. 26 on the Billboard Alternative Songs chart and No. 45 on the UK Singles Chart. This version was also later included on the soundtrack for the 2007 film Juno. It was also featured in the film The Frighteners and in the theatrical trailer for High Tension. It likewise appeared in professional skateboarder Jerry Hsu's part in Bag of Suck. On a November 25, 2009, broadcast of the National Public Radio program Fresh Air, Richard Carpenter expressed his distaste for this version.
 Usher Raymond IV performed the selection, in homage to Vandross, on the 2005 album So Amazing: An All-Star Tribute to Luther Vandross; for his version, he received a Grammy nomination for Best Male R&B Vocal Performance.
 My Chemical Romance lead vocalist Gerard Way also covered the song.

See also
 List of number-one adult contemporary singles of 1971 (U.S.)

References

Sources
 October 2002 Blender magazine article by Johnny Black
 [ Allmusic discussion of song's origins]
 Randy L. Schmidt, Little Girl Blue: The Life of Karen Carpenter, Chicago Review Press, 2010, pp. 77–78.
 IMDB listing of Bette Midler television appearances
 Australian PopArchives entry
 Australian Countdown entry

External links
 

1969 songs
1970 singles
1971 singles
1984 singles
A&M Records singles
Atco Records singles
Atlantic Records singles
Epic Records singles
Colleen Hewett songs
Bette Midler songs
Delaney and Bonnie songs
Cher songs
Leon Russell songs
Luther Vandross songs
Ruben Studdard songs
Songs written by Leon Russell
Sonic Youth songs
The Carpenters songs
Usher (musician) songs
Songs about musicians
Songs about groupies